is a Japanese actress and voice actress who is best known for her role as Chisato Jougasaki/Mega Yellow in the 1997 Super Sentai series Denji Sentai Megaranger, and Later Reprised Her Role in the Teamup Special Megaranger Vs Gingaman. Her former stage name was  - which was similar, but written in kanji.

Filmography

Television
 Choukou Senshi Changéríon - Mayumi (1996)
 Denji Sentai Megaranger - Chisato Jougasaki/Mega Yellow   (1997-1998)
 Kamen Rider Kuuga - Nozomi Sasayama (2000-2001)
 GoGo Sentai Boukenger - Natsuki's mother (2006-2007) / episodes 33 and 34

Film
 Denji Sentai Megaranger vs. Carranger - Chisato Jougasaki/Mega Yellow   (1997)
 Seijuu Sentai Gingaman vs. Megaranger - Chisato Jougasaki/Mega Yellow (1998)
Hyakujuu Sentai Gaoranger vs. Super Sentai - Jougasaki Chisato / Mega Yellow   ( 2001)

Voice roles
 Power Rangers in Space - cameo appearance (2001 -2002)
 Power Rangers Lost Galaxy - Maya/Yellow Galaxy Ranger (Cerina Vincent) (2002 - 2003) 
 Power Rangers: Lightspeed Rescue -  Winslow Kelsey / Yellow lightspeed Rescue ( 2003 -2004)

References

External links
Official profile 

1977 births
Living people
Japanese voice actresses
People from Kanagawa Prefecture